Thornhill House is a Grade II listed house at 78 Deodar Road, Putney, London SW15, built in about 1890 by the Kensington builder Mr Wakefield, and incorporating parts of Wandsworth Manor, a late 17th-century house demolished in 1890.

References

External links
 

Grade II listed buildings in the London Borough of Wandsworth
Houses in the London Borough of Wandsworth
Putney
Grade II listed houses in London
Houses completed in the 19th century